Mark Begor (born c. 1959) is an American business executive. He is the CEO of Equifax.

Early life
Begor was born circa 1959. He graduated from Syracuse University with a bachelor's degree and earned a master in business administration from the Rensselaer Polytechnic Institute.

Career
Begor worked for General Electric for 35 years. He subsequently worked for Warburg Pincus. He has been serving as the chief executive officer of Equifax since April 16, 2018.

References

External links
Equifax Bio

Living people
1950s births
Syracuse University alumni
Rensselaer Polytechnic Institute alumni
American chief executives
Equifax people